The term Hubi is dedicated to the Huzhou ink brush (Traditional Chinese: 湖筆; Simplified Chinese: 湖笔; Pinyin: Húbǐ; "Hú" stands for Huzhou, "Bǐ" meaning "ink brush").

Name

The ink brushes are produced in Huzhou (湖州) of Zhejiang Province, China. Historically, the workshops of ink brushes were congregated in Wuxin (Traditional Chinese: 吳興; Simplified Chinese: 吴兴; Pinyin: Wú Xìng), currently Wuxing District of Huzhou. So it's also named Wuxing Hubi (Traditional Chinese: 吳興湖筆; Simplified Chinese: 吴兴湖笔; Pinyin: Wúxìng Húbǐ).

History

Huzhou has a long history of manufacturing ink brushes, and it can be traced back to Qin Dynasty. Huzhou's ink brush production and manufacture gained prominence in the Ming Dynasty (13th century). Now Huzhou is known as the "Hometown of Ink Brush".

Huzhou also holds annual "Huzhou Ink Brush Festival", and the festival also has some memorial activities dedicated to Meng Tian - the inventor of ink brush pen.

Famous ink brush makers

There are several famous craftsmen in history from Huzhou, the early big five were:
 Tang Jianchi
 Yao Zhenxing
 Zhong Weijin
 Chen Yunqin
 Fei Sanduo

Workshop
The most famous brush pen workshop in Huzhou could be the Shanlian (Traditional Chinese: 善璉; Simplified Chinese: 善琏; Pinyin: Shàn Liǎn), and its brush pens are named Shanlian Hubi (Traditional Chinese: 善璉湖筆; Simplified Chinese: 善琏湖笔; Pinyin: Shànliǎn Húbǐ).

Shanlian is also a local place name, whose ancient name was Mengxi (蒙溪, literally means "the creek of Meng Tian"). Meng Tian made brush pens there.

See also
 Daiyuexuan writing brush: another famous kind of brush.
 Four Treasures of the Study
 Huzhou
 Ink brush
 Meng Tian
 Xuan writing brush: another famous brush

References
 Records of the Grand Historian: The Biography of Meng Tian (《史記·蒙恬列傳》)

External links
 Four Types of Famous Writing Brush in China 

Chinese ink brush
Huzhou
Culture in Zhejiang